The discography of the American noise pop band Scarling (usually stylised as Scarling.) consists of two studio albums, two extended plays, and five singles.

Studio albums

Extended plays

Singles

Other appearances

Cover songs 

 "Creep" by Radiohead
 "Wave of Mutilation" by Pixies
 "I Started a Joke" by the Bee Gees
 "Daisy Bell" by Harry Dacre

Music videos

References 

Scarling. albums
Scarling. songs
Discographies
Discographies of American artists